Langtunafjella is a mountain ridge in Sabine Land at Spitsbergen, Svalbard. It has a length of about twelve kilometers. The highest peak is 933 m.a.s.l. At the western side of the ridge is the glacier Tunabreen, and at the eastern side is Bogebreen.

References

Mountains of Spitsbergen